The Mbum–Day languages are a subgroup of the old Adamawa languages family (G6, G13, G14, & Day), provisionally now a branch of the Savanna languages. These languages are spoken in southern Chad, northwestern Central African Republic, northern Cameroon, and eastern Nigeria.

Languages
Blench (2006) groups the Mbum (G6), Bua (G13), Kim (G14), and Day languages together within part of a larger Gur–Adamawa language continuum.

Bua
Kim
Mbum
Day

The Kim, Mbum, and Day are also grouped together in an automated computational analysis (ASJP 4) by Müller et al. (2013)

See also
List of Proto-Lakka reconstructions (Wiktionary)
List of Proto-Bua reconstructions (Wiktionary)
Kim word lists (Wiktionary)

References

 
Atlantic–Congo languages